Harvest Rain is the musical project of Jason Thompkins. Born and raised in South Carolina, Thompkins attempts to capture a spiritual dimension of the South in Harvest Rain's music. It has been labeled as neofolk music, but Harvest Rain have invented a whole new genre, called Audiodrug. Meaning the music itself is like a drug and can be used to induce various stages of consciousness. Members include Chris Mehl, lifelong friend of the Thompkins brothers. Juan A. of Chilean group DER ARBEITER. Axel Frank of the German neofolk group Werkraum and also Jamey Thompkins, Jason's younger brother. Matt Howden also plays guest violin for the first two tracks of their demo A Frost Comes with the Wind. Derek Lown contributed to the album ‘Nightwave’ and has been a permanent member of the band since 2019.

The music of Harvest Rain often has a ghostly quality while the lyrics are hallucinatory in nature. Subjects deal with ghosts, death, the dark history of the South, Hyperborea/Thule, dawn, lanterns, cornfields and various other themes of the supernatural and paranormal. Most of the albums were recorded under ritualistic settings, inside old churches, outside in fields, in old abandoned plantation homes and various weathered places. Harvest Rain dedicated their The Land of Tears is So Mysterious release to Esoteric Hitlerism figure Miguel Serrano. Harvest Rain invoke the 'Mysteries' of old and is a musical diary of Jason Thompkins life.

Discography
 A Frost Comes with the Wind (2002) – demo/CD
 Security of Ignorance (2002) – 10"x12" (White Marbled vinyl)
 Evening and Devotion (2004) – 7"
 Night Chorus (2005) - CD
 Songs from Evening (2005) – CD-R
 Night's Glow (2006) - Digipack CD
 Blood Hymns (2007)
 The Land of Tears is so Mysterious (2010) - CD with 16 Page Booklet of Arctic Photography and Lyrics
 'Nightwave' (2016) - Digipack CD with lyric booklet

External links
Official Harvest Rain Website

American folk musical groups
Neofolk music groups